Mailín Vargas Escalona (born 24 March 1983 in Bartolomé Masó, Granma) is a Cuban shot putter.

Career
She finished tenth at the 2008 Olympic Games. She achieved a personal best throw of 19.00 metres in July 2008 in Alcalá de Henares. She improved this to 19.02 m in June 2009, winning the Barrientos Memorial in Cuba.  In 2011, she improved this further to 19.11 m.

Personal bests
Outdoor
Shot put: 19.13 m –  La Habana, 3 June 2011
Indoor
Shot put: 18.23 m –  Valencia, 28 February 2010

Achievements

References

External links

Tilastopaja biography
Ecured biography (in Spanish)

1983 births
Living people
Cuban female shot putters
Athletes (track and field) at the 2008 Summer Olympics
Athletes (track and field) at the 2012 Summer Olympics
Athletes (track and field) at the 2011 Pan American Games
Olympic athletes of Cuba
Universiade medalists in athletics (track and field)
Universiade gold medalists for Cuba
Medalists at the 2009 Summer Universiade
Pan American Games competitors for Cuba
People from Granma Province
20th-century Cuban women
21st-century Cuban women